The 2018 CBSA Haining Snooker International Open was a non-ranking snooker tournament that took place between 31 July–4 August 2018 in Haining, China.

Prize fund 
The breakdown of prize money of the event is shown below:

Main draw

Top half

Section 1

Section 2

Section 3

Section 4

Bottom half

Section 5

Section 6

Section 7

Section 8

Finals

Final

References 

Haining Open
Haining Open
Haining Open
Haining Open
Haining Open